The Brawler is a 2019 American biographical film directed by Ken Kushner and starring Zach McGowan as Chuck Wepner.  The film also stars Amy Smart and Taryn Manning.

Plot
Chuck is a heavyweight boxer ranked in the top ten struggling to provide for his wife Phyllis and children. One day he receives news that he will be fighting the champion Muhammad Ali. With the help of his trainer and manager Al Braverman, Chuck trains full-time for the upcoming bout. Prior to a press conference between the two boxers, Ali requests a surprised Chuck to racially berate him to generate press, though Chuck refuses during the conference.

Though Wepner manages to score a knockdown against Ali, he is dominated in the fight, getting knocked down in the 15th round. However, Chuck becomes a local hero, with him receiving a call that a film was being produced based on his fight with Ali, subsequently winning best picture. Chuck allows the fame to get to his head, and begins systematically partying, cheating on his wife and doing cocaine. Phyliss eventually finds out and, after a bitter argument, leaves him.

After engaging in a mixed wrestling/boxing match with Andre the Giant, a down on his luck Wepner meets a woman called Linda in a bar. He is also given the chance by Sylvester Stallone to audition for a role in Rocky II, though following a confrontation with the producer, his part gets cut. He subsequently gets into a falling out with his brother Donnie.

After taking an unsanctioned bout with Victor, a wrestling Bear, he gets arrested and imprisoned for a botched drug-deal. During his time, he meets Stallone in prison, who is filming for his upcoming movie Lock Up. Two years later, he is released from prison, and later marries Linda.

By 1993, Chuck continues his previous work as a liquor salesman and abstains from drugs, also reconciling with Donnie. Chuck is subsequently approached by John Olsen to sign memorabilia at his shop. Though suspicious, he agrees to do signings for Olsen, being later arrested for involvement in a Sports memorabilia fraud that Olsen had headed. However, no serious charges are made against Chuck and he is eventually let go. He later meets Stallone a third time during his filming of Cop Land. Chuck is increasingly irritated for what little compensation he was given for the Rocky film and successfully sues Stallone, finally allowing Chuck to settle down into a comfortable life.

Cast

Reception
On Metacritic, the film has a score of 46 out of 100, based on four critics, indicating "mixed or average reviews".

See also
Chuck (film), another biographical film about Wepner.

References

External links
 
 

2010s sports drama films
2019 biographical drama films
American boxing films
American biographical drama films
Sports films based on actual events
Biographical films about sportspeople
Vertical Entertainment films
Cultural depictions of American men
Cultural depictions of boxers
Cultural depictions of Sylvester Stallone
2019 drama films
2019 films
2010s English-language films
2010s American films